Transpeptidase may refer to:
 DD-transpeptidase, a bacterial enzyme that cross-links the peptidoglycan chains to form rigid cell walls
 Gamma-glutamyl transpeptidase, a liver enzyme
 D-glutamyl transpeptidase
 A protein-sorting transpeptidase (e.g. sortase), that cleaves a C-terminal sorting signal from its target protein(s) and then covalently attaches the remainder to the cell surface.